The Chapelle Saint-Gibrien is a historic chapel in Montcourt, Sauvigny, Meuse, France. It was built in the 13th century. It was named after Saint Gibrian. When the hamlet of Moncourt was destroyed in the 15th century, the chapel was guarded by a hermit.

References

13th-century Roman Catholic church buildings in France